Saughtree is a hamlet in the Scottish Borders at the junction of the B6357 and an unnamed road from Kielder village in Northumberland, England. It is at the confluence of the River Liddle [Liddel Water] and Dawston Burn. The valley of the Liddle is known as Liddesdale. The nearest settlements on the B6357 are Bonchester Bridge (13 km to the north east), Newcastleton (13 km to the south west) and Kielder village (11 km to the south east). It is approximately 6 km from the border with England.

Saughtree Fell is a hill which rises to 450m. Saughtree Church was built in 1875 and is in the Parish of Castleton. The former manse next to the church was built in 1891.

Saughtree railway station, near Riccarton Junction railway station is now a private dwelling. The station buildings now provide bed and breakfast accommodation. Saughtree Railway Viaduct has been demolished. Places nearby include Castleton, Dinlabyre, Hermitage Castle, the Hermitage Water. the Wauchope Forest, and the Newcastleton Forest.

See also
List of places in the Scottish Borders

References
 Jeffrey, A (1855-1864), 'The History and Antiquities of Roxburghshire and Adjacent Districts from the most remote period to the present time', London; Edinburgh. Held at RCAHMS D.1.3.JEF.R

External links

SCRAN image: Saughtree Railway Viaduct overlooking roadway to Saughtree station
RCAHMS record of Saughtree
RCAHMS record of Saughtree Fell
RCAHMS record of 'Kid's Wa's
Old Roads of Scotland: Liddesdale
Disused Stations: Saughtree
The Liddle Water Fault, Borders

Villages in the Scottish Borders